Coy Koopal (22 July 1932 – 2 December 2003) was a Dutch footballer. He played in six matches for the Netherlands national football team in 1956.

References

External links
 

1932 births
2003 deaths
Dutch footballers
Netherlands international footballers
Place of birth missing
Association footballers not categorized by position